Star City is a city in, and the county seat of, Lincoln County, Arkansas, United States. Incorporated in 1876, the city is located between the Arkansas Delta and Arkansas Timberlands. With an economy historically based on agriculture, today Star City has developed a diverse economy based on both industry and agriculture. As of the 2010 census, the population was 2,274. Star City is located within the Pine Bluff metropolitan area.

Geography
Star City is located at  (33.940947, -91.842575).

The city is located between Monticello and Pine Bluff.

Demographics

2020 census

As of the 2020 United States census, there were 2,173 people, 686 households, and 450 families residing in the city.

2000 census
As of the census of 2000, there were 2,471 people, 875 households, and 603 families residing in the city. The racial makeup of the city was 76.93% White, 21.08% Black or African American, 0.61% Native American, 0.04% from other races, and 0.77% from two or more races.  1.21% of the population were Hispanic or Latino of any race.

There were 875 households, out of which 37.4% had children under the age of 18 living with them, 46.5% were married couples living together, 18.6% had a female householder with no husband present, and 31.0% were non-families. 28.8% of all households were made up of individuals, and 15.8% had someone living alone who was 65 years of age or older.  The average household size was 2.52 and the average family size was 3.10.

In the city, the population was spread out, with 27.0% under the age of 18, 7.9% from 18 to 24, 24.8% from 25 to 44, 17.5% from 45 to 64, and 22.9% who were 65 years of age or older.  The median age was 38 years. For every 100 females, there were 75.4 males.  For every 100 females age 18 and over, there were 69.8 males.

The median income for a household in the city was $32,197, and the median income for a family was $40,156. Males had a median income of $34,107 versus $19,630 for females. The per capita income for the city was $13,998.  About 15.9% of families and 18.2% of the population were below the poverty line, including 27.0% of those under age 18 and 11.8% of those age 65 or over.

Arts and culture

Star City was the setting for the 1992 police thriller film One False Move, starring actors Bill Paxton and Billy Bob Thornton, and written by Thornton. However, only limited filming was done there with the bulk of the movie shot in Cotton Plant, Arkansas.

Annual cultural events
Star City used to be the home of the annual STARDAZE festival. The festival used to draw people from all over southeastern Arkansas.

Education

The Star City School District operates public schools: Jimmy Brown Elementary School, Star City Middle School, and Star City High School.

Infrastructure

Transportation

Roads

Star City is located at the intersection of US Highway 425 (US 425) and Highway 11 (AR 11). US 425 is a major north-south highway in southeast Arkansas and connects the city to Pine Bluff to the north and Monticello to the south. AR 11 provides access to Gould and US 65 to the east and US 63 to the west.

AR 530 currently terminates near Star City. This route is a two-lane freeway segment of a future extension of Interstate 530 (I-530) south to Monticello. In Monticello, the planned extension will connect to future Interstate 69, a proposed road connecting Port Huron, Michigan, and Rosenberg, Texas.

References

External links

 "Star City Mileage Chart." Star City School District.

Cities in Lincoln County, Arkansas
Cities in Arkansas
County seats in Arkansas
Cities in Pine Bluff metropolitan area